Ponmaanai Thedi is a 1998 Indian Tamil language comedy drama film directed by Paari. The film stars Saravanan and Suvarna Mathew, with Vinu Chakravarthy, R. Sundarrajan, Delhi Ganesh, Vadivelu, Vennira Aadai Moorthy and Sathyapriya playing supporting roles. It was released on 6 November 1998.

Plot

Sundaram (Saravanan) is a young wastrel while his father Ayyappan (Vinu Chakravarthy) is a rich house owner. Ayyappan can't bear Sundaram's laziness. One day, his cousin Priya (Suvarna Mathew) and her parents come from Mumbai to Sundaram's village. Priya is a well-educated and modern girl. Sundaram falls in love with her. Ayyappan decides to solemnise the marriage between Sundaram and Priya. In the meantime, Priya's parents arrange her marriage with another man. Ayyappan hides the truth to the naive Sundaram. At the wedding day, Sundaram manages to stop the wedding in time. In contrast, Priya slaps him and reveals that she was not in love with Sundaram. The groom's family cancels the wedding and Shanmugam dies of heart attack. What transpires later forms the crux of the story.

Cast

Saravanan as Sundaram
Suvarna Mathew as Priya
Vinu Chakravarthy as Ayyappan, Sundaram's father
R. Sundarrajan as Chinna Paiyan
Delhi Ganesh as Priya's father
Vadivelu
Vennira Aadai Moorthy
Sathyapriya as Hamsavalli, Priya's mother
Vichithra
S. N. Lakshmi
A. Sakunthala
C. K. Saraswathi as Sundaram's grandmother
Latha
Kavyasri
Sempuli Jagan
Pandu
King Kong as Kuruvi
Thangavel
Omakuchi Narasimhan
Bhaskar
Manikandan as Sundaram's brother
Kovai Senthil
Karuppu Subbaiah as Subbaiah
Bonda Mani

Soundtrack

The film score and the soundtrack were composed by Soundaryan. The soundtrack, released in 1998, features 5 tracks with lyrics written by Soundaryan, Piraisoodan and Hussein Bharathi.

References

1998 films
1990s Tamil-language films
Indian drama films